Consolation is the fourth studio album by the Japanese girl group Kalafina released on 20 March 2013 under Sony Music Japan label.

Track listing

Usage in media
Hikari Furu: ending theme for Anime movie Puella Magi Madoka Magica The Movie Part II: Eternal Story
to the beginning: opening theme for anime Fate/Zero for 2nd season
Manten: insert song for anime Fate/Zero
Mirai: insert song for anime movie Puella Magi Madoka Magica The Movie Part I: Beginnings Story

Charts

References

External links
Oricon Profile: Limited Edition A | Limited Edition B | Regular Edition

2012 albums
Kalafina albums
Japanese-language albums
SME Records albums